Robert Barrie (born 11 October 1951) is an Australian modern pentathlete. He competed at the 1972 and 1980 Summer Olympics. He is head coach of Bulli Swords Club and also coaches swimming in Wollongong.

References

External links
 

1951 births
Living people
Australian male modern pentathletes
Olympic modern pentathletes of Australia
Modern pentathletes at the 1972 Summer Olympics
Modern pentathletes at the 1980 Summer Olympics
20th-century Australian people
21st-century Australian people